John Stone (September 12, 1888 – June 3, 1961) was an American film producer and screenwriter. He was born in New York City and died in Los Angeles, California. He produced more than 70 films between 1930 and 1946. He also wrote for more than 60 films between 1921 and 1948, often during the early 1920s using the pen name Jack Sturmwasser. He was the father of the screenwriter and playwright Peter Stone.

Partial filmography

 Bar Nothing (1921) writer
 Play Square (1921) writer
 What Love Will Do (1921) writer
 The Jolt (1921) writer
 Live Wires (1921) writer
 Little Miss Smiles (1922) writer
 The Yosemite Trail (1922) writer
 Iron to Gold (1922) writer / scenarist
 While Justice Waits (1922) writer
 Times Have Changed (1923) writer
 Bucking the Barrier (1923) writer
 Forgive and Forget (1923) writer
 Innocence (1923) writer
 The Heart Buster (1924) writer
 Gold Heels (1924) writer
 The Lucky Horseshoe (1925) writer
 The Timber Wolf (1925) writer
 The Shamrock Handicap (1926) writer
 3 Bad Men (1926) writer
 Hard Boiled (1926) writer
 A Man Four-Square (1926) writer
 No Man's Gold (1926) writer
 The Broncho Twister (1927) writer
 Nevada (1927) writer
 Daredevil's Reward (1928) writer
 Win That Girl (1928)
 Fugitives (1929)
 Forbidden Melody (1933)
 Primavera en otoño (1933)
 El rey de los gitanos (1933)
 Las fronteras del amor (1934)
 La cruz y la espada (1934)
 Baby Take a Bow (1934) producer
 Nothing More Than a Woman (1934)
 She Learned About Sailors (1934) producer
 Charlie Chan in London (1934) producer
 Charlie Chan's Courage (1934) producer
 Charlie Chan in Shanghai (1935) producer
 The Great Hotel Murder (1935) producer
 Charlie Chan in Paris (1935) producer
 Charlie Chan's Secret (1936) producer
 Charlie Chan at the Race Track (1936) producer
 Charlie Chan at the Opera (1936) producer
 Charlie Chan at the Circus (1936) producer
 Ramona (1936) producer
 Under Your Spell (1936) producer
 Mr. Moto's Gamble (1938) producer
 Quick Millions (1939) producer
 Charlie Chan in Reno (1939) producer
 Mr. Moto in Danger Island (1939)

External links
 
 
  (n.b. as of January 21, 2011, TCM appears to have credits for a later John Stone commingled with this John Stone)

1888 births
1961 deaths
Film producers from California
American male screenwriters
Writers from Los Angeles
Writers from New York City
20th-century American male writers
Screenwriters from New York (state)
Screenwriters from California
Film producers from New York (state)
20th-century American screenwriters